William Clark (December 19, 1670 - July, 1742) was a merchant and town official in Boston, Massachusetts in the late 17th and early 18th centuries. Around 1713 he built a large house at North Square in Boston's North End.

Biography

Clark was born in Boston in 1670 to physician John Clark; siblings included future speaker of the House, John Clark. In 1702 he married Sarah Brondson; their children included Robert Clark and Benjamin Clark.

William Clark "held several minor town offices, as constable in 1700; overseer of the poor in 1704; ... tithing-man in 1713, 1715 and 1718; ... selectman of Boston from 1719 to 1723, and representative to the General Court, 1719-22, 1724 and 1725." He attended Old North Church (i.e. Second Church), and was a member of the Ancient and Honorable Artillery Company of Massachusetts.

"His death in 1742 [was] attributed by some to the loss of forty sail of vessels in the French wars." Clark was buried "in his tomb at Copp's Hill, marked by a tablet bearing the family arms.".

References

Further reading
 Henry Lee. The Clark and Hutchinson Houses. Proceedings of the Massachusetts Historical Society, Vol. 18, 1881; p. 344+
 Oliver Ayer Roberts. History of the Military Company of the Massachusetts, now called the Ancient and Honorable Artillery Company of Massachusetts, 1637–1888; v.1 Boston: A. Mudge & Son, 1895; p. 316+

1670 births
1742 deaths
People from North End, Boston
18th century in Boston